Central Welfare Council  (sometimes also translated as Main Social Services Council--Polish, Rada Główna Opiekuńcza) was one of the very few Polish social organizations that were allowed to work under the German occupation of Poland in World War I and World War II.

It was created during World War I in 1916 and again re-created in February 1940 in the General Government. It had its departments in most of Polish towns and cities. Among its main tasks were organization of:

 Cheap bars with hot soup for the poor and the expelled; almost 2000 such facilities were opened for almost 300,000 people
 Shelters and hostels for displaced persons and the poor
 Holiday camps for children as well as rest-homes for children and elderly people
 Places of free exchange of clothing and food as well as providing the poor with garments; up to 300,000 people a year were offered warm clothing
 Educational facilities and trade schools (other schools were forbidden)
 Relief for the expelled from Polish areas annexed by Germany, Zamość area, Volhynia and residents of Warsaw during and after the Warsaw Uprising
 Sending food packages for the POWs and prisoners of German concentration camps

It is estimated that the RGO helped an average of 800,000 people every year until 1944. The council was headed by prince Janusz Radziwiłł (until June 1940), count Adam Ronikier (until October 1943) and Konstanty Tchórznicki (until April 1945). The council had at least 15 000 volunteers all around Poland.

The council received finances from the German authorities and (clandestinely) from the Polish Government in Exile.

Adam Ronikier was a president during WWI and during WWII till 1943.

References

Poland in World War II
Humanitarian aid organizations of World War II
Non-profit organisations based in Poland